The 16th congressional district of Illinois is represented by Republican Darin LaHood.

Geographic boundaries

2011 redistricting
The congressional district covers parts of DeKalb, Ford, Stark, Will and Winnebago counties, and all of Boone, Bureau, Grundy, Iroquois, LaSalle, Lee, Livingston, Ogle and Putnam counties, as of the 2011 redistricting which followed the 2010 census. All or parts of Belvidere, Channahon, DeKalb, Dixon, Loves Park, Machesney Park, Ottawa, Morris, Pontiac, Rockford and Streator are included. The representatives for these districts were elected in the 2012 primary and general elections, and the boundaries became effective on January 5, 2013.

2021 redistricting

Due to the 2020 redistricting, this district will shift to encompass most of central Northern Illinois, including covering the majority of the Wisconsin-Illinois border. The district takes in Jo Daviess, Ogle, Lee, Stark, Marshall, and Grundy Counties; most of Winnebago, Boone, Bureau, Henry, and McLean Counties; half of Stephenson, Peoria, Tazewell, Putnam, and Livingston Counties; and part of DeKalb and Ford Counties.

Winnebago County is split between this district and the 17th district. They are partitioned by West State Road, West State St, School St, Monroe St, Victory St, North Springfield Ave, Auburn St, North Central Ave, West Riverside Blvd, Eagle Dr, Soo Line Railroad, Park Ridge Rd, East Dr, River Ln, N 2nd St, Windsor Rd, N Alpine Rd, E Riverside Blvd, Forest Hills Rd, Pepper Dr, Cardamon Ln, Sage Dr, Gingeridge Ln, Applewood Ln, Windsor Rd/Broadcast Parkway, McFarland Rd, Harlem Rd, Illinois Highway 39, Keith Creek, Olde Creek Rd, N Trainer Rd, Spring Brook Rd, N Mulford Rd, Spring Creek Rd, Delcy Dr, Taliesen Ln/Jonquil Rd, Arbutus Rd, Saratoga Ln, Norwich Dr, Monticello Ln, Guilford Rd, Mauh-Nah-Tee-See, Inverness Dr, Donna Dr, Garrett Ln, Triton Ave, Apawamis Way E, Shiloh Rd, N Perryville Rd, Argus Dr, Deane Dr, US Highway 20, S Trainer Rd, Laurel Cherry Dr, Stony Creek Way, Newburg Rd, Homewood Dr, Dorchester Dr, Villanova Dr, Highland Ter, Wichita Dr, Capetown Ave, Charles St, S Mulford Rd, Forest Trail Dr, Samuelson Rd, 35th St, Tesa Rd, Sonja Ln, Lockout Dr, Houston Rd, Scarlet Oak Rd, Fruitland Dr, 20th St, Mobile Home Ave, 11th St, Falcon Rd, Beltline Rd, Kishwaukee Rd, Rock River, S Springfield Ave, Prairie Rd, and Tipple Rd. The 15th district takes in the municipalities of South Beloit, Roscoe, New Milford, Machesney Park, and Rockton; and most of Loves Park.

Boone County is split between this district and the 11th district. They are partitioned by Orth Rd, Poplar Grove Rd, Woodstock Rd, McKinley Ave, Squaw Prairie Rd, Beloit Rd, Illinois Business Route 20, Kishwaukee River, Wynwood Dr, N Appleton Rd, S Appleton Rd, Illinois Highway 5, and Stone Quarry Rd. The 11th district takes in half of the municipality of Belvidere.

Bureau County is split between this district and the 14th district. They are partitioned by Illinois Highway 26, US Highway 180, 2400 St E, and 2400 Ave N. The 16th district takes in the municipalities of Princeton, Wyanet, Buda, and Sheffield.

Henry County is split between this and the 17th district. They are partitioned on the northwest side by Shaffer Creek, Oakwood Cir, Oakmont Dr, Oakwood Country Club, Glenwood Rd, US Highway 6, E 450th St, Illinois Highway 280, Green River Rd, and Kings Dr. They are partitioned on the southeast side by E 1770th St, N 650th Ave/N 570th Ave, Timber Rd, E 2400th St, and N 1200 St. The 16th district takes in the municipalities of Cambridge, Geneseo, Orion, Atkinson, and Annawan.

McLean County is split between this district and the 17th district. They are partitioned by E 1000 North Rd, N 250 East Rd, E 1200 North Rd, Middle Fork Sugar Creek, E 1250 North Rd, N 750 East Rd, E 1300 North Rd, E 1280 North Rd, N 900 East Rd, E 1350 North Rd, E 1400 North Rd, N 1100 East Rd, N Rivian Motorway, King Mill Creek, Illinois Highway 74, Hovey Ave, S Cottage Ave, Gregory St, N Adelaide St, W Raab Rd, N Towanda Ave, E Shelbourne Dr, Old Route 66, Hershey Rd, E College Ave, Illinois Highway 55, Sugar Creek, General Electric Rd, Rainbow Ave, Mill Creek Rd, Clearwater Ave, Newcastle Dr, Illinois Highway 9, S Towanda Barnes Rd, Central Illinois Airport, Winchester Dr, S Hershey Rd, E Oakland Ave, S Veterans Parkway, S Mercer Ave, Norfolk and Southern Railroad, Rhodes Ln, E Hamilton Rd, S Morris Ave, Six Points Rd, W Oakland Ave, Fox Creek Rd, Crooked Creek Rd, Carrington Ln, and N 1200 East Rd. The 16th district takes in the municipalities of Lexington, Le Roy, Chenoa, El Paso, and Hudson; northern Normal; and part of Bloomington.

Stephenson County is split between this district and the 17th district. They are partitioned by Daws Rd, Howardsville Rd, Cedarville Rd, N Fawver Rd, and Maize Rd. The 16th district takes in the municipalities of Lena, Davis, Dakota, Orangeville, and Winslow.

Peoria County is split between this district and the 17th district. They are partitioned by W Gerber Rd/W Rosenbohm Rd, W Southport Rd, BN & SF Railroad, W Southport Rd, N Townhouse Rd, W Cottonwood Rd, N McAllister Rd, W Greengold Rd, W Farmington Rd, N Kickapoo Creek Rd, Saint Mary's Cemetery, N Swords Ave, N Northcrest Dr, C & NW Railroad, Weaverridge Golf Club, W Charter Oak Rd, Illinois Highway 6, W War Memorial Dr, N Allen Rd, W Northmoor Rd, Big Hollow Creek, West Imperial Dr, West Willow Knolls Dr, North University St, Manning Park, West Teton Dr, Illinois Highway 40, North Prospect Rd, East Prospect Ln, North Montclair Ave, East Euclid Ave, North Grandview Dr, Forest Park Nature Center, Forest Park Apartments, North Galena Rd, Illinois Highway 29, and Forest Park Riverfront-Longshore. The 16th district takes in the municipalities of Chillicothe and Brimfield; and northern Peoria.

Tazewell County is split between this district and the 17th district. They are partitioned by Illinois River, S 3rd St, Prince St, Elm St, Maple St, Mechanic St, Koch St, 5th St, Illinois Central Railroad, Townline Rd, Highway I-55, Illinois Highway 122, Indian Creek, Southwest Lincoln St, Southeast Main St, Hopedale Rd, Springtown Rd, Mackinaw Rd, and Lagoon Rd. The 16th district takes in the municipalities of Pekin, East Peoria, Washington, Morton, Hopedale, Minier, and North Pekin.

Putnam County is split between this district and the 17th district. They are partitioned by Illinois River, S Front St, E High St, N 2nd St, E Court St, E Mulberry St, N 3rd St, N 4th St, N 6th St, E Sycamore St, S 5th St, Coffee Creek, Illinois Highway 26, and N 600th Ave. The 16th district takes in the municipalities of McNabb and Magnolia; and part of Hennepin.

Livingston County is split between this district and the 2nd district. They are partitioned by N 1800 Rd East, E 1550 Rd North, N 1600 Rd East, E 1500 Rd North, N 1500 Rd East, W Reynolds St, Highway 55, The Slough, E 1830 Rd North, Old IL-66 South, N 1700 Rd East, N 2125 Rd North, and N 1800 Rd East. The 16th district takes in the municipalities of Cornell and Flanagan.

DeKalb County is split between this district, the 11th district, and the 14th district. They are partitioned by Myelle Rd, Bass Line Rd, Illinois Highway 23, Whipple Rd, Plank Rd, Swanson Rd, and Darnell Rd. The 16th district takes in the municipalities of Wilkinson, Kirkland, Fairdale, and Esmond.

Ford County is split between this district and the 2nd district. They are partitioned by E 900N Rd, N Melvin St, E 8th St, and N 500E Rd. The 16th district takes in the municipality of Gibson City.

History
Prominent past representatives from the 16th district have included Everett Dirksen, who went on to become the Republican leader in the United States Senate; John B. Anderson, who became the 3rd highest ranking Republican in the House and went on to run as a major independent candidate in the 1980 Presidential election; and Lynn Martin, who later served as United States Secretary of Labor.

For more than six decades, the shape of the 16th district fluctuated far less than that of any other Illinois congressional district. In this time, it generally included the northwest corner of the state, extending just far enough to the east to grab its largest city, Rockford. By the 1990s, it also extended eastward to include part of McHenry County, an outer suburb of Chicago.  This geographic stability also contributed to electoral stability.  It first became a Rockford-based district for the 1948 election, and from then until 2012 it was represented by just five people, all but one of whom was a Republican. The sole Democrat to have held it in that period, John W. Cox, Jr., only did so for one term.

However, with the new map drawn for 2012, the 16th was significantly redrawn.  It was pushed well to the east to include the southwestern exurbs of the Chicago metropolitan area, and stretches from the Wisconsin border to the Indiana border.  While it still included most of Rockford's suburbs, half of Rockford itself—essentially the more Democratic western portion of the city—was shifted to the 17th district.

Recent election results

2012

2014

2016

2018

2020

2022

Recent statewide election results

List of members representing the district

Historical district boundaries

See also
Illinois's congressional districts
List of United States congressional districts

References

 Congressional Biographical Directory of the United States 1774–present

External links
Washington Post page on the 16th District of Illinois
U.S. Census Bureau - 16th District Fact Sheet

16
Boone County, Illinois
Carroll County, Illinois
DeKalb County, Illinois
Jo Daviess County, Illinois
McHenry County, Illinois
Ogle County, Illinois
Stephenson County, Illinois
Whiteside County, Illinois
Winnebago County, Illinois
Constituencies established in 1873
1873 establishments in Illinois